Hollyworld is a role playing game published in 2005 by Blacksburg Tactical Resource Center (BTRC), and designed by Greg Porter.

Setting
Hollyworlds premise is both simple and humorous.  What if everything behaved like it does in big budget action movies?  Falling rarely does damage, explosions can't hurt if you are running away from them, and children and cute creatures must be rescued.  All characters are Actors, and have a goal of becoming more famous than other actors.

System
Hollyworld uses a custom game system, designed for fast, easy and non-realistic play. Every character is an Actor, and everything that happens is part of a Movie.  Characters have only two stats: Style and Substance'.

Blacksburg Tactical Research Center games
Comedy role-playing games
Role-playing games introduced in 2005